Monuments memorializing both soldiers and sailors may refer to (alphabetized by state and locale):

 Soldiers' and Sailors' Memorial Arch (Hartford, Connecticut)
 Soldiers and Sailors Monument (New Haven), Connecticut
 Soldiers and Sailors Monument (Delphi, Indiana)
 Soldiers' and Sailors' Monument (Indianapolis), Indiana
 Union Soldiers and Sailors Monument, Baltimore, Maryland
 Soldiers and Sailors Monument (Boston), Massachusetts
 Michigan Soldiers' and Sailors' Monument, Detroit, Michigan
 Soldiers and Sailors Monument, Tennent, New Jersey
 Soldiers and Sailors Monument, in Lafayette Square (Buffalo), New York
 Soldiers' and Sailors' Arch, Brooklyn, New York, in the Grand Army Plaza
 Lewis County Soldiers' and Sailors' Monument, Lowville, New York
 Soldiers' and Sailors' Monument (Manhattan), New York
 Soldiers and Sailors Monument (Jamaica, Queens, New York)
 Soldiers' and Sailors' Monument (Rochester, New York)
 Soldiers and Sailors Monument (Syracuse, New York)

 Soldiers and Sailors Monument (Troy, New York)
 Soldiers and Sailors Monument (Raleigh, North Carolina)
 Soldiers' and Sailors' Monument (Cleveland), Ohio
 Soldiers' and Sailors' Monument (Elyria, Ohio)
 Soldiers' and Sailors' Monument (Allentown, Pennsylvania)
 Soldiers and Sailors of the Confederacy Monument, Gettysburg, Pennsylvania
 Soldiers and Sailors Monument (Lancaster, Pennsylvania)
 Soldiers and Sailors Monument (Providence), Rhode Island
 Confederate Soldiers and Sailors Monument, Richmond, Virginia

See also
 Soldiers and Sailors Memorial Coliseum, Evansville, Indiana
 Soldiers and Sailors Memorial Hall and Museum, Pittsburgh, Pennsylvania
 Soldiers and Sailors Memorial Auditorium, Chattanooga, Tennessee
Mansfield Memorial Museum, originally Soldiers and Sailors Memorial Hall in Mansfield, Ohio